Francis Loomis may refer to:

 Francis B. Loomis (1861–1948), 25th United States Assistant Secretary of State
 Francis Loomis (lieutenant governor) (1812–1892), Lieutenant Governor of Connecticut, 1877–1879
 Francis Wheeler Loomis (1889–1976), American scientist
 Francis B. Loomis Jr. (1903–1989), United States Marine Corps general

See also
 Frank Loomis (1896–1971), American athlete
 Loomis (surname)